Ahmadabad, Bhalki  is a village in the southern state of Karnataka, India. It is located in the Bhalki taluk of Bidar district in Karnataka.

See also
 Bidar
 Districts of Karnataka

References

External links
 http://Bidar.nic.in/ 

Villages in Bidar district